The Haas Institute for a Fair and Inclusive Society at UC Berkeley was founded in 2010 through funding by the Evelyn and Walter Haas Jr. Fund, as  a part of the UC Berkeley Initiative for Equity, Inclusion, and Diversity. Organized into seven research clusters, the Haas Institute involves over 100 researchers and faculty across the University of California system. Eight endowed chairs focused on equity and inclusion form the core of the clusters.

Goals
The goals of the Haas Institute are:
 advancing multidisciplinary research and policy analysis;
 building relationships among researchers, organized stakeholders and policy makers to effect change;
 employing strategic communication to illuminate research and impact policy; and
 make a difference.

Personnel
Directors
Haas Institute's directors are john a. powell, director; Denise Herd, Associate Director; and Stephen Menendian, assistant director and director of research.

Staff
The Haas Institute lists its current staff on its web site.

Research clusters
At the heart of the Haas Institute are seven clusters of teaching and research focusing on urgent areas of disparity. "Working collaboratively, we feel we can make the most immediate and enduring difference toward developing and sustaining a more equitable and insluve society." The seven research clusters are:
 Disability Studies
 Diversity and Democracy
 Diversity and Health Disparities
 Economic Disparities
 LGBTQ Citizenship
 Race, Diversity and Educational Policy
 Religious Diversity

References

External links
 

University of California, Berkeley